The Comunidade Intermunicipal do Médio Tejo (English: Middle Tagus) is an administrative division in Portugal. It was created in December 2008, replacing the former Comunidade Urbana do Médio Tejo created in 2004. It takes its name from the river Tagus. Médio Tejo is also a NUTS 3 subregion of Centro Region: since January 2015, the NUTS 3 subregion has covered the same area as the intermunicipal community. The seat of the intermunicipal community is Tomar. Médio Tejo comprises parts of the former districts of Santarém and Castelo Branco.

Municipalities
The CIM Médio Tejo is composed of 13 municipalities:

Gallery

References

External links
CIM Médio Tejo Official Website

Intermunicipal communities of Portugal
Centro Region, Portugal